Christmas Shopper Simulator is a sandbox video game developed by Freak Storm Games and published by British retailer Game. The game was released on 16 December 2014 as promotional freeware for the company.

Gameplay 
Players control either a male or female avatar inside a shopping centre. Players are able to use the game's physics engine to destroy the environment, although this provides no specific reward to the player. The objective of the game is to complete all the quests, which can be obtained by using a payphone in-game. The game's quests include kicking open crates to obtain a panda mask, to jumping on maintenance platforms to obtain a doll. Full completion requires that the player gets every achievement. The freeform destruction of the game was compared to Goat Simulator.

Reception
Christmas Shopper Simulator was received favourably upon release. The game is also popular among gaming communities, with numerous high-profile YouTube channels producing Let's Play videos of the game.

Sequel
Game released a follow-up sequel entitled Christmas Shopper Simulator 2: Black Friday the following year.

References

External links 
 Official site

2014 video games
Windows games
MacOS games
Christmas video games
Parody video games
Video games developed in the United Kingdom
Video games featuring protagonists of selectable gender
Advergames
Single-player video games